Dhuan Kalan is a village near Deoli city, in the Tonk district of Rajasthan, India. Khurd and Kalan Persian language word which means small and Big respectively when two villages have same name then it is distinguished as Kalan means Big and Khurd means Small with Village Name.

The famous saint and social reformer Dhanna Bhagat was born in village Chauru in Tonk district but his father moved to this village and settled here. This village was earlier known as Abhaynagar. There is a Gurudwara of Saint Dhanna Bhagat in village Duan Kala. There was a grand 'Gurumat chetna yatra' started from this Gurudwara in 2004 in memory of completion of 400 years of Gurugranth sahib.

References

Villages in Tonk district